The Federal Government College, Ido-ani, Ondo State, is a secondary institution located in Idoani, Ondo State in Nigeria.

The school, like other Federal Government Colleges in Nigeria, was created by the Nigerian government as one of the federally funded "Unity schools" to bring together students from regions across Nigeria. The school has facilities for both boarding and day students. Students range from Junior Secondary One (JS1) through Senior Secondary Three (SS3). Students must complete the Federal Common Entrance Exams in order to apply for attendance.

For those that lived on campus, both females and males lived in different hostels; subdivided into house colors, mainly red, green, purple, yellow and blue. While each house color consists of at least 4 room, each room is mainly occupied by those at the same class level or grade level with an addition person to manage the affairs of the room, this person would in most cases if not all, be an SS3 student.
Among all federal government colleges created, FGC idoani had students who were very very outstanding and brilliant students who were exceptionally gifted as well as recording success in sport at the biannual fedcoll games.

The founding principal was Chief Omotade, who remained as principal until 1985 when he was transferred to Federal Government College Portharcourt.

Past Administrations of the School

Since 1978 when the school was established, some of the Principals have taken their turns to administer the school at one time or the other.

Below is the list of Principals and their period of stewardship in the college.

Notable alumni
Deji Akinwande, engineer
Akin Alabi, cinematographer, music video director, and graphic designer
Mai Atafo, bespoke fashion tailor
Simbo Olorunfemi, poet, journalist, and business person
Spellz, recording producer
Oyekan Temilade, Nurse
Tajudeen Adeyemi Adefisoye House of Representative Member Idanre-Ifedore constituency in Ondo State
Olumuyiwa Olumilua Commissioner for Information and Values Orientation, Ekiti state
Oladele John Nihi Vice President West Africa, Panafrican Youth Union

Gallery

See also 
Federal Government College Enugu
Federal Government College Ikot Ekpene
Federal Government Girls College, Benin City

Secondary schools in Nigeria
Schools in Ondo State
Educational institutions established in 1978
1978 establishments in Nigeria
Government schools in Nigeria